Thomas Anthony Bawden (19 October 1912 – 9 September 1994) was an Australian rules footballer who played with Essendon in the Victorian Football League (VFL).

He was the older brother of Richmond player, Bob Bawden.

Notes

External links 		
		
		
		
		
		
	
1912 births
1994 deaths
Australian rules footballers from Victoria (Australia)
Essendon Football Club players